The 2020–21 season was Partick Thistle's first season in the third tier of Scottish football in Scottish League One, having been relegated from the Scottish Championship at the end of the 2019–20 season. On 15 April 2020, the SPFL voted to end the lower leagues in Scottish football due to the coronavirus pandemic and as a result Partick were relegated to League One after two years in the Championship, which the club decided not to take legal action against. Partick Thistle also competed in the League Cup, and the Scottish Cup.

Summary
On 2 October 2020, the SPFL confirmed that the Scottish Challenge Cup had been cancelled for the upcoming season. Partick Thistle began their season on 7 October in the League Cup group stage with the League One season beginning on 17 October.

On 11 January 2021, all football below the Scottish Championship was postponed due to the COVID-19 pandemic.

On 29 January 2021, the suspension was extended until at least 14 February. In March 2021, the Scottish Government gave permission for the league to resume.

On 16 March, clubs from League 1 and 2 voted to implement for a reduced 22-game season with a league split after 18 games.

On 29 April, Thistle were declared champions of League One and secured promotion to the Scottish Championship following their 5-0 victory over promotion rivals Falkirk.

Competitions

Scottish League One

Scottish League Cup

Group stage

Scottish Cup

Squad statistics

Player statistics

|-
|colspan="12"|Players who left the club during the 2020–21 season
|-

|}

Club statistics

League table

Division summary

League Cup table

Transfers

In

Out

Loans In

Loans Out

See also
 List of Partick Thistle F.C. seasons

References

Partick Thistle F.C. seasons
Partick Thistle